is a Japanese football manager and former player who played as a midfielder. She was most recently the head coach of the Thailand senior and under-20 women's national teams.

At the 2022 AFC Women's Asian Cup, her usage of unusual tactics and out-of-position players, such as striker Pitsamai Sornsai in defence, led to Thailand only winning a single match in the group stage and losing 7-0 to defending champions Japan in the quarter-finals, as well as both play-off matches to regional rivals Vietnam and Chinese Taipei. She was criticised after the tournament, but continued to hold on to her job and led the War Elephants to a silver medal at the 2021 Southeast Asian Games in Vietnam.

Managerial statistics

Honours

Manager
Thailand Women
 2021 Southeast Asian Games:  Silver medal
 AFF Women's Championship runner-up: 2022

See also
 Japan Football Association (JFA)

References

1978 births
Living people
Japanese women's footballers
Japanese women's football managers
Women's association football midfielders
Female association football managers
Miyo Okamoto